The 2003 NCAA Skiing Championships were contested at the Dartmouth Skiway in Lyme, New Hampshire as part of the 50th annual NCAA-sanctioned ski tournament to determine the individual and team national champions of men's and women's collegiate slalom and cross-country skiing in the United States.

Utah, coached by Kevin Sweeney, won the team championship, the Utes' ninth co-ed title and tenth overall.

Venue

This year's championships were contested at the Dartmouth Skiway in Lyme, New Hampshire. The event was hosted by nearby Dartmouth College.

These were the second NCAA championships hosted at the Dartmouth Skiway (1958 and 2003) and the eighth in the state of New Hampshire (1958, 1964, 1970, 1978, 1984, 1992, 1995, and 2003).

Program

Men's events
 Cross country, 10 kilometer freestyle
 Cross country, 20 kilometer classical
 Slalom
 Giant slalom

Women's events
 Cross country, 5 kilometer freestyle
 Cross country, 15 kilometer classical
 Slalom
 Giant slalom

Team scoring

 DC – Defending champions
 Debut team appearance

See also
 List of NCAA skiing programs

References

2003 in sports in New Hampshire
NCAA Skiing Championships
2003 in alpine skiing
2003 in cross-country skiing
NCAA Skiing Championships
College sports in New Hampshire
Skiing in New Hampshire